Paraguayan Communist Party (in Spanish: Partido Comunista Paraguayo) is a communist political party in Paraguay. PCP was founded on February 19, 1928. Later it was recognized as a section of the Communist International. It was brutally suppressed during the military regimes of the country. It gained legality for a brief period in 1936 and then again in 1946-1947. After the fall of the Alfredo Stroessner regime the party re-emerged as a legal party.

Overview
 After the Cuban Revolution the PCP began armed struggle. Its armed wing was the United National Liberation Front (FULNA). It was defeated in 1963. In 1967, the party split, and the pro-China wing formed the Paraguayan Communist Party (independent). The general secretary of the PCP is Najeeb Amado.

PCP was a founding member of United Left (IU) in 2002, but later it withdrew in 2003. However a fraction of PCP, Movimiento por la Recuperación Democrática del Partido Comunista Paraguayo, chose to continue to work within IU. The withdrawal was motivated by differences over electoral strategy and candidature.

On September 20, 2004 a Communist Party of Paraguay (PC-Paragauay) was founded by faction that split from the PCP. The secretary general is Miguel Flores.

During 2008 presidential election, PCP supported the candidate of Patriotic Alliance for Change, Fernando Lugo, who won the election.

PCP publishes Adelante (Forward).

References

External links
Official site of PCP
Antonio Bonzi: Proceso Historico del Partido Comunista Paraguayo

Paraguay
Communist parties in Paraguay
Formerly banned communist parties
Foro de São Paulo
Political parties established in 1928
Political parties in Paraguay

International Meeting of Communist and Workers Parties